Perdue is a village in the Canadian province of Saskatchewan within the Rural Municipality of Perdue No. 346 and Census Division No. 12.

History 

Perdue incorporated as a village on July 15, 1909.

Demographics 

Economy 
Perdue is equipped with services, especially considering its relatively small size and proximity to larger centres such as Biggar and Saskatoon. Downtown Perdue is home to the Perdue branch of the Biggar Credit Union, The Store groceries and liquor & Ezeewrap headquarters, the post office, an insurance broker, Perdue Hotel (which was built in the early 1900s) stands on Main Street.), Kielo Certified Massage Therapist and Perdue Massage and Acupuncture. The community also has a daycare centre. Along Highway 14 is Full line Ag and Great Plains Co-Op, and west of town are the Perdue Oasis golf course and restaurant.

Recreation and activities 
Within the village of Perdue are several recreational facilities. On the west edge of town are the baseball diamonds, the curling rink, the fairgrounds, and the bowling alley. On the east edge of town was the Perdue Arena, which burnt down in 2015, but the community began fundraising for a new arena shortly after.

The Perdue Agricultural Society hosts Extreme Redneck Days on Canada Day which consists of ATV and mod truck mud drag races, Li'l Buckaroo Rodeo and various entertainment plus beer gardens and fireworks. Also hosted by the Society is the annual Perdue Fair on the last weekend of July. This takes place with 4H events held at the fairgrounds, a slow-pitch tournament, and handicraft and agricultural exhibits displayed in the curling rink and Perdue Recreation Complex. Entries are judged by local members of the Agricultural Society. There is also a parade during the fair that travels through the village, ending up at the fair grounds.

In the past Perdue has been home to ice hockey teams of all age levels bearing the name "Perdue Pirates", which used the Perdue Arena as their home facility.

Perdue is also home to a branch of the Royal Canadian Legion and Legion Ladies Auxiliary.

Government 
The village of Perdue is surrounded by the Rural Municipality of Perdue No. 346, whose office is located in Perdue, the municipality had a slightly larger population of 445 in the 2016 Canada Census.

The village of Perdue is governed by four Councillors a mayor and an administrator.

Provincially the village is within the Rosetown-Elrose electoral district, whose current MLA is Jim Reiter of the Saskatchewan Party.

Federally the village is within the riding of Carlton Trail-Eagle Creek whose current MP is Kelly Block of the Conservative Party of Canada. The village's postal code is S0K 3C0 and its telephone exchange is (306) 237-###.

Education 
Perdue School is a K-12 school with approximately 140 students. 
Perdue is home to the Perdue branch of the Wheatland Regional Library, which is located in the Perdue Recreation Complex. The Perdue School has volleyball teams, basketball, cross country, track, badminton and more; they are the Perdue Steelers. The 2008 Senior Boys Volleyball team made it to Provincials.

References

Villages in Saskatchewan
Perdue No. 346, Saskatchewan
Division No. 12, Saskatchewan